In the late 19th and early 20th centuries, African-American organized crime emerged following the first and second large-scale migration of African-Americans from the South to major cities of the Northeast, Midwest, and later the West Coast. In many of these newly established communities and neighborhoods, criminal activities such as illegal gambling (e.g. the numbers racket), speakeasies and bootlegging were seen in the post-World War I and Prohibition eras. Although the majority of these businesses in African-American neighborhoods were operated by African Americans, it is often unclear the extent to which these operations were run independently of the larger criminal organizations of the time. 

Colloquially, black West Indian American criminal organizations operating in the US, such as the Yardies, Shower Posse or Jamaican posse, may occasionally and mostly erroneously be included under the label of "African-American organized crime", but they are usually classified as culturally and ethnically separate criminal entities from African-American crime groups (and in fact often feud with established African-American crime groups).

History

Prohibition and the Great Depression 
During the 1920s and 1930s, African American organized crime was centered in New York's Harlem where the numbers racket was largely controlled by Casper Holstein and the "Madam Queen of Policy", Stephanie St. Clair. St. Clair later testified at the Seabury Investigation that, during 1923 to 1928, the NYPD continued to arrest her number runners despite her making payoffs. At that time, Harlem numbers rackets were largely operated by independent policy bankers such as St. Clair; the Harlem rackets later began to receive more protection from police interference following their eventual (partial) takeover by mobster Dutch Schultz and the largely Italian and Jewish “National Crime Syndicate” in the late 1930s.

In Kings: The True Story of Chicago's Policy King's and Numbers Racketeers, Nathan Thompson writes:

Post-World War II
In the years following the end of the World War II, African American organized crime grew along with the rise of African American social consciousness and later political, social and economic upward mobility. The African-American gangster Bumpy Johnson established close ties with the New York Italian-American Mafia and Jewish Mob in the post-war years, establishing some degree of independence for African-American organized crime groups in Harlem from the dominant New York organized crime groups. Many of the major drug traffickers in the United States emerged during the early-to-mid-1960s, such as Leroy "Nicky" Barnes, Guy Fisher, and Frank Lucas, taking advantage of the increasing political strength during the civil rights movement.

Previously dependent partially on the political and police protection of New York's Five Families, African American gangsters were able to negotiate with outside criminal organizations and establish a stronger independent hold over certain territories, and the Mafia's ability to control or impose a “street tax” on criminal operations in African-American neighborhoods began to wane. African-American and Italian-American organized crime groups in the Northeast and Midwest instead began to cooperate (and at times compete) to a greater extent than in previous decades, increasingly sharing profits and coordinating rackets.

By the early 1970s, the large narcotics empires created by Nicky Barnes, Frank Matthews, and Frank Lucas began expanding beyond Harlem as Lucas sought to ultimately control a large-scale drug trafficking operation by gaining control of a network from Indochina directly to the streets of ghettos across the country. Other criminal groups started smuggling marijuana and cocaine in cities including New York City, Baltimore, Washington, D.C. as well as in New Jersey, California, Florida and Toronto, Ontario, Canada. Other groups such as the Black Mafia in Philadelphia, whose members were also linked to the Nation of Islam, took over the heroin trade and extorted other groups.  Later, a younger group paying homage to the Black Mafia named themselves the Junior Black Mafia and were also heavily involved in drug trafficking, specifically crack-cocaine, during the mid-1980s to early 1990s.

Meanwhile, on the West Coast in Oakland, California, Felix Mitchell and his 69 Mob ran a large scale drugs trafficking operation, generating income of nearly a million dollars in monthly business.

According to a United States Senate sub-committee on organized crime during the 1980s, one of the most sophisticated, corporate-like, structured, organized crime  groups outside of the Italian mafia was The Young Boys Inc. (AKA YBI). Founded by a small group of teen-aged friends on Detroit's west side in the mid-1970s, in less than two years, YBI took over the majority of southeast Michigan's heroin trade with absolutely no interference from any other crime groups.

At its peak, YBI sales were an estimated $300,000 a day. The  murder of one of the founders, Dwayne Davis (AKA Wonderful Wayne), and a series of federal indictments on 2 of the remaining bosses and 40 of the top lieutenants crippled YBI in 1982. There were a few lieutenants who survived, one in particular carried on the organization in Detroit and Boston through the late 1980s until crack cocaine became the drug of choice over heroin.

African American gangs 

Most recently, highly structured African American gangs have made headlines for their ability to pull in hundreds of millions of dollars in illegal drug profits. At their peak, the Chicago-based Gangster Disciples were reported to generate $100 million in drug revenue .  The rise and fall of the Detroit-based Black Mafia Family, which made nearly $250 million through their drug trafficking ventures during the late 1990s, has been brought to light by federal investigations.

In popular culture

Films and television series featuring African-American organized crime
Shaft (1971)
Across 110th Street (1972)
Black Caesar (1973)
Hell Up in Harlem (1973)
Live and Let Die (1973)
Black Belt Jones (1974)
The Black Godfather (1974)
Coonskin (film) (1975)  
J. D.'s Revenge (1976)
Black Heat (1976)
The Warriors (1979)
Harlem Nights (1989)
New Jack City (1991)
Pulp Fiction (1994)
Oz (1997–2003)
Hoodlum (1997)
Belly (1998)
Hot Boyz (1999)
Romeo Must Die (2000)
Training Day (2001)
Made (2001)
Bones (2001)
Paid in Full (2002)
The Shield (2002–2008)
The Wire (2002–2008)
Assault on Precinct 13 (2005)
Carlito's Way: Rise to Power (2005)Four Brothers (2005)Get Rich or Die Tryin' (2005)Waist Deep (2006)American Gangster (2006–2009)American Gangster (2007)Gangland (2007–2010)Mr. Untouchable (2007)The Dark Knight (2008)Sons of Anarchy (2008–2014)Before I Self Destruct (2009)Boardwalk Empire (2010-2014)Person of Interest (2011)
”Snowfall (2017-2023)Power (2014-2020)The Grid (2017)Superfly (2018)
 Godfather of Harlem (2019)
 Fargo (season 4) (2020)
 The Many Saints of Newark (2021)
 BMF (TV series) (2021)

Influence on music
 Black organized crime is a frequent topic in rap and hip-hop music, particularly in the subgenres of gangsta rap.
 In the song "Ghetto Qu'ran" rapper 50 Cent mentions several drug dealing figures in his neighborhood, including the notorious Kenneth "Supreme" McGriff. It is believed that this song led to the murder of Jam Master Jay and the shooting of 50 Cent himself.
Demetrius "Big Meech" Flenory, leader of the Black Mafia Family, was known to be good friends with Fabolous, Jay-Z, Puff Daddy (Big Meech's bodyguard was Puff Daddy's ex-bodyguard), Young Jeezy, and a number of other high-profile rappers. The BMF organization is largely responsible for giving Young Jeezy "street credibility", which translates to high album sales in the rap world, by showing up in the hundreds to his shows towards the beginning of his career.

Portrayal in video gamesGrand Theft Auto III (2001) has several missions provided to the player by D-Ice, the incarcerated leader of the Red Jacks, a gang involved in a turf war with a rival group called the Purple Nines.
 Grand Theft Auto: San Andreas (2004) is extensively centered on African-American organized crime, with many of the gangs being based on real-life gangs such as Bloods, Crips, and Mexican street gangs.Grand Theft Auto IV (2008) has missions provided to the player by Playboy X the leader of a gang called the North Holland Hustlers. 
 Saints Row (2006) features the Vice Kings, a street gang/crime syndicate involved in arms trafficking, drug dealing, gambling, and prostitution, and are also involved in the music industry through a front company called Kingdom Come Records. They serve as antagonists alongside the Westside Rollerz and Los Carnales.
 Mafia II (2010) features a small gang called the Bombers who appear in a few missions and the DLC "Jimmy's Revenge". For the most part, the Bombers are small in number and lack the notoriety of other criminal groups present in Empire Bay.
 
 Among the antagonists in Watch Dogs (2014) are the Black Viceroys, who were originally a civil-rights group until they turned to crime after their founder was murdered. Under their current leader, army veteran Delford "Iraq" Wade, the Viceroys have become one of Chicago's most powerful criminal outfits, with Iraq training a select number of members in advanced combat and communication techniques. He also forms an alliance with the Chicago South Club, an Irish Mob group, to provide security for Club operations. The majority of the Viceroys' revenue stems from traditional drug manufacturing and marketing operations, but also includes embezzlement, extortion, bribery, kidnapping, and even cybercrime. It is stated in the game that Iraq's vast collection of blackmail is the only reason the local authorities have not made much of an effort to stamp out the Viceroys.
 In Mafia III (2016), the protagonist Lincoln Clay is a member of the Robinson clan, a black mafia family in a fictionalized New Orleans, who are later massacred by Italian-American mobsters who give their territories over to the Dixie Mafia. The game also features a Haitian mafia led by Cassandra, a Haitian mambo. They specialize in gun-running and marijuana trafficking, and initially oppose Lincoln until he absorbs them into his criminal empire. However, if he chooses to antagonize them by denying them new territories, they may break their alliance and declare war on him.

See also
List of African-American gangs in the United States

References
Kelly, Robert J. Encyclopedia of Organized Crime in the United States. Westport, Connecticut: Greenwood Press, 2000. 
Thompson, Nathan. Kings: The True Story of Chicago's Policy King's and Numbers Racketeers. Bronzeville Press, 2003. 
 U.S. judge bars capital prosecution of drug lord 
 Date: July 1, 1994 Publication: The Atlanta Journal and The Atlanta Constitution Page Number: G/3 Word Count: 566
 Date: June 30, 1994 Publication: The Atlanta Journal and The Atlanta Constitution Page Number: A/1 Word Count: 596
 Date: August 11, 1993 Publication: The Atlanta Journal and The Atlanta Constitution Page Number: D/1 Word Count: 323
 Date: October 13, 1990 Publication: The Atlanta Journal and The Atlanta Constitution Page Number: A/1 Word Count: 854

Further reading
Cooley, Will. "Jim Crow Organized Crime: Black Chicago's Underground Economy in the Twentieth Century," in Building the Black Metropolis: African American Entrepreneurship in Chicago, Robert Weems and Jason Chambers, eds. Urbana: University of Illinois Press, 2017, 147–170. 
Ianni, Francis A.J. Black Mafia: Ethnic Succession in Organized Crime. New York: Simon and Schuster, Inc., 1974.
Schatzberg, Rufus. Black Organized crime in Harlem, 1920-1930. New York: Garland Publishing, Inc., 1993.
Schatzberg, Rufus and Kelly, Robert J. African American Organized Crime: A Social History''. New Brunswick, NJ: Rutgers University Press, 1997.

External links
Black Gangs of Harlem: 1920-1939 at the Crime Library